is a manga adaptation by Hideki Mori of a novel with the same title by Ken'ichi Sakemi.
The manga was serialized in Big Comic (Shogakukan) from 1992 to 1996 and won the 40th Shogakukan Manga Award in 1995. 
It was adapted in to the 2006 Chinese, Korean, Japanese, and Hong Kong joint film, A Battle of Wits.
The manga version changes the era, and the longer the series is serialized, the more exaggerated the part that was written as a subsequent episode in the novel.

Plot 
About 2,300 years ago, China during the Warring States period, where the seven kingdoms of Han, Wei, Zhao, Qi, Yan, Qin, and Chu.
Zhao had a large army on the border on the other side of the river, ready to attack Liangcheng, a small walled city in Yan.
The lord of Liangcheng asked for help from the Mohists, a group of experts in defending fortified cities, to protect his castle. However, only one person, Kakuri, arrived.
Only one month remained before the 15,000-strong Zhao army arrived. In order to repair the city walls, upgrade the weapons, and train the peasants to become soldiers, Kakurei urges the lord of the fortified city to give him full control of the city, much to the displeasure of the generals.
Distrusted and even hated, Kakuri eventually gained the trust of the citizens of Liangcheng.
With no support from the Mohists, Kakuri faces off against a large army.

Publication 
Big Comics (Tankōbon), 11 volumes
Shogakukan Bunko (Bunko) 8 volumes

See also
 Mohism

References

External links
墨攻 (Bokkō) Big Comic Bros.net - 

Historical comics
Cultural depictions of Qin Shi Huang
Seinen manga
Shogakukan manga
Winners of the Shogakukan Manga Award for general manga